Empire III: Armageddon is a 1983 video game published by Edu-Ware Services Inc. It is the third game in the Empire trilogy, preceded by Empire I: World Builders (1981) and Empire II: Interstellar Sharks (1982).

Gameplay

Set during the decline of the galactic imperial civilization, the player attempts to escape "the City", survive combat in the arena, and finally work with underground rebel groups in the Wilderness to defeat the Imperial forces, seize control of the Great Pyramid, and eliminate the Empress.

Reception
Michael B. Williams reviewed the game in Compute! magazine, concluding that "Empire III Armageddon nicesly ties up the Empire trilogy with a superb challenge for gamers."

References

External links
Review in Compute!

1983 video games
Apple II games
Apple II-only games
Role-playing video games
Science fiction video games
Video games developed in the United States
Edu-Ware games